The 2016–17 Hobart Hurricanes' season was the team's 6th season in the Big Bash League (BBL).

Ladder

Regular season

2016/17 squad
Players with international caps are listed in bold.
Ages are given as of 20 December 2016, the date of the first match of the tournament

Home attendance

References

External links
 Official website of the Hobart Hurricanes
 Official website of the Big Bash League

Hobart Hurricanes seasons
2016–17 Big Bash League